Thomas Anthony "Tomie" dePaola (September 15, 1934 – March 30, 2020) was an American writer and illustrator who created more than 260 children's books, such as Strega Nona. He received the Children's Literature Legacy Award for his lifetime contribution to American children's literature in 2011.

Early life and education

DePaola was born in Meriden, Connecticut, to a family of Irish and Italian heritage, the son of Joseph and Florence May (Downey) DePaola. He had one brother, Joseph (nicknamed Buddy), and two sisters, Judie and Maureen. His paternal grandparents originated from Calabria, where he set his well-known book Strega Nona.  His book The Baby Sister is about Maureen being born. DePaola was attracted to art at the age of four, and credited his family with encouraging his development as an artist and influencing the themes of his works.

After high school, dePaola studied art at the Pratt Institute in Brooklyn and graduated in 1956 with a Bachelor of Fine Arts degree. He was a pupil and lifelong friend of Roger Crossgrove.

Career

Teaching 
DePaola taught art at Newton College of the Sacred Heart outside Boston from 1962 to 1966, then moved to California, where he taught at San Francisco College for Women from 1967 to 1970. He received a Master of Fine Arts degree from California College of Arts and Crafts in 1969 and a doctoral equivalency from Lone Mountain College in San Francisco. DePaola relocated to New England in the 1970s, teaching art at Chamberlayne Junior College in Boston from 1972 to 1973. From 1973 to 1976, he worked at Colby-Sawyer College in New London, New Hampshire, as an associate professor, designer, and technical director in the speech and theater department and as writer and set and costume designer for the Children's Theatre Project. He taught art at New England College in Henniker, New Hampshire, from 1976 to 1978. DePaola retired from full-time teaching in 1978 to devote his time to writing and illustrating books. He provided illustrations for Maggie and the Monster Baby (Holiday House, 1987) by Elizabeth Winthrop.

Writing 
The first published book that dePaola illustrated was a 1965 volume in the Coward-McCann series "Science is what and why": Sound, written by Lisa Miller. The first that he wrote and illustrated was The Wonderful Dragon of Timlin, published by Bobbs-Merrill in 1966. His writing career spanned over 50 years during which he worked on more than 270 books. Close to 25 million copies of his books were sold worldwide, and were translated into over 20 languages. Perhaps his most well-known work, Strega Nona, was first published in 1975 and was a finalist for the coveted Caldecott Medal for best illustrated work.

Television 
DePaola appeared in several episodes of Barney & Friends as himself. In 2001, he also appeared as himself in the Jim Henson Company series Telling Stories with Tomie dePaola.

Exhibitions 
DePaola had two exhibitions in 2013-2014 at the Colby-Sawyer College. The first, called "Then" showed his early work during his formative years at the Pratt Institute and the influence Fra Angelico, George Roualt and others had on him. The second exhibition was of his later work, called "Now," came out close to dePaola's 80th birthday.

Personal life and death 
DePaola was gay. He came out later in his life, telling The New York Times Magazine in 2019 that, for much of his career, "If it became known you were gay, you’d have a big red ‘G’ on your chest... and schools wouldn’t buy your books anymore."

DePaola had resided in New London, New Hampshire, where he taught from 1973 to 1976.

DePaola died at the Dartmouth-Hitchcock Medical Center on March 30, 2020, in Lebanon, New Hampshire, according to his literary agent, Doug Whiteman. He was badly injured in a fall in his barn studio the previous week and died of complications following surgery. He was survived by his two sisters Judith and Maureen (the latter being his best friend) and many nieces and nephews.

Awards and honors

In 2011, dePaola received the biennial Children's Literature Legacy Award from the U.S. children's librarians, which recognizes a living author or illustrator whose books, published in the United States, have made "a substantial and lasting contribution to literature for children". The committee noted the wide range of his stories and his "innate understanding of childhood, a distinctive visual style, and a remarkable ability to adapt his voice to perfectly suit the story." It called Strega Nona, the wise Grandma Witch, "an enduring character who has charmed generations of children."

The Pratt Institute honored him with an honorary doctorate on May 18, 2009. The New Hampshire Institute of Art honored him with an honorary Doctorate of Fine Arts on May 20, 2018.

For his contribution as a children's illustrator, dePaola was the U.S. nominee in 1990 for the biennial, international Hans Christian Andersen Award, the highest international recognition for creators of children's books.

For single works he has won the 1983 Golden Kite Award, Picture Book Illustration, from the Society of Children's Book Writers and Illustrators for Giorgio's Village, which he also wrote. He won the 1994 Aesop Prize from the American Folklore Society for Christopher, the Holy Giant and the 2000 Southwest Book Award from the Border Regional Library Association for Night of Las Posadas. 
 
DePaola received a Caldecott Honor in 1976 (Strega Nona), the 1982 Boston Globe-Horn Book Award (The Friendly Beasts: An Old English Christmas Carol), the 1987 Golden Kite Award (What the Mailman Brought), and the 2000 Newbery Medal (26 Fairmount Avenue). The Caldecott and Newbery Medals are the premier annual American Library Association awards for picture book illustration and children's book writing, respectively.

He won the 2000 Jeremiah Ludington Memorial Award from the Educational Paperback Association for his cumulative "significant contribution to the educational paperback business".

Selected Works

Strega Nona series
Strega Nona (1975)
Big Anthony and the Magic Ring (1979)
Strega Nona's Magic Lessons (1982)
Merry Christmas, Strega Nona (1986)
Strega Nona Meets Her Match (1993)
Strega Nona—Her Story (1996)
Big Anthony—His Story (1998)
Strega Nona Takes a Vacation (2000)
Brava, Strega Nona!: A Heartwarming Pop-Up Book (2008)
Strega Nona's Harvest (2009)
Strega Nona's Gift (2011)
Strega Nona Does It Again (2013)
Strega Nona and Her Tomatoes (2017) – a Ready-to-Read book
Strega Nona and the Twins (2017) – a Ready-to-Read book

Memoir series (first chapter book)
26 Fairmount Avenue
Here We All Are
On My Way 
What a Year
Things Will Never Be the Same (The War Years)
I'm Still Scared (The War Years)
Why? (The War Years)
For the Duration (The War Years)

Big Books
Front Porch Tales and North Country Whoppers
Christmas Remembered
Tomie dePaola's Big Book of Favorite Legends
Tomie dePaola's Book of Bible Stories
Tomie dePaola's Favorite Nursery Tales
Tomie dePaola's Mother Goose

About growing up and his family
The Art Lesson
The Baby Sister
Nana Upstairs & Nana Downstairs
Stagestruck
Tom
Tony's Bread
Watch Out for the Chicken Feet in Your Soup

Bill and Pete books
Bill and Pete
Bill and Pete Go Down the Nile
Bill and Pete to the Rescue

The Barkers
Boss for a Day
Hide and Seek All Week
Meet the Barkers
Morgan and Moffat Go to School
A New Barker in the House
Trouble in the Barker's Class

Board books for the very young
I Love You Sun, I Love You Moon
Marcos Counts
Mary Had a Little Lamb
Mice Squeak We Speak
Tomie's Little Book of Love
Tomie's Baa Baa Black Sheep
Tomie's Little Book of Poems
Tomie's Little Mother Goose
Tomie's Mother Goose Flies Again
Tomie's Three Bears and Other Tales

Video (in DVD format)
Tomie Live in Concert
Oliver Button is a Star

Legends, folktales and stories
Adelita A Mexican Cinderella Story, a version of Cinderella
Alice Nizzy Nazzy: The Witch of Santa Fe
Andy That's My Name
”Charlie Needs a Cloak”
The Cloud Book
The Comic Adventures of Old Mother Hubbard
Cookie's Week
Days of the Blackbird
Erandi's Braids
Fin M'Coul
Four Friends at Christmas
Four Friends in Autumn
Four Friends in Summer
Four Stories for Four Seasons
Helga's Dowry
Hey Diddle Diddle and Other Mother Goose Rhymes
Hunter and the Animals
I Love You, Mouse
Jamie O'Rourke and the Big Potato
Jamie O'Rourke and the Pooka
Knight and the Dragon
Legend of the Bluebonnet
Legend of the Indian Paintbrush
Legend of the Persian Carpet
Little Grunt and the Big Egg
Mice Squeak We Speak
Michael Bird-Boy
Mr. Satie and the Great Art Contest
Mysterious Giant of Barletta
Now One Foot, Now the Other
Oliver Button is a Sissy
Pancakes for Breakfast
The Popcorn Book
The Quicksand Book
The Quilt Story
Smart about Art: Frida Kahlo
Shh! We're Writing the Constitution
T-Rex Is Missing
The Tale of Rabbit and Coyote
The Wind and the Sun, a retelling of the fable The North Wind and the Sun

Religious or holiday stories
Angels Angels Everywhere
The Birds of Bethlehem
The Cat on the Dovrefell: A Christmas Tale
Christina's Carol
Christopher the Holy Giant
The Clown of God
Country Angel Christmas
The First Christmas
Francis Poor Man of Assisi
The Friendly Beasts: An Old English Christmas Carol
Get Dressed Santa
The Good Samaritan and Other Parables
Guess Who's Coming to Santa's for Dinner?
Hark! A Christmas Sampler (written by Jane Yolen)
Hurry, Santa!
The Holy Twins
Jingle the Christmas Clown
Joy to the World: Tomie's Christmas Stories'The Lady of GuadalupeThe Legend of Old Befana, concerning a witch (known as Befana) who brings presents to good children on Epiphany Eve (the night of January 5)Legend of the PoinsettiaLet The Whole Earth Sing PraiseMary, the Mother of JesusMiracles of JesusMiracle on 34th Street, illustrator, 1984My First ChanukahMy First ChristmasMy First EasterMy First HalloweenMy First PassoverMy First ThanksgivingThe Night before ChristmasThe Night of Las PosadasParables of JesusPascual and the Kitchen AngelsPatrick Patron Saint of IrelandPetook: The Rooster Who Met Jesus (text by Caryll Houselander)Queen EstherThe Song of FrancisThe Story of the Three Wise KingsTomie DePaola's Christmas Tree BookTomie's Little Christmas PageantFine art
Station of the Cross (Set of 14) in Abbey Church of Our Lady of Glastonbury, Hingham, Massachusetts
Depiction of St. Benedict in Abbey Church of Our Lady of Glastonbury, Hingham, Massachusetts
Frescoes in Refectory of Glastonbury Abbey, Hingham, Massachusetts
Dominican Retreat and Conference Center Chapel Mural, Niskayuna, New York
Depiction of Mary and Child, Chapel and Cultural Center, Troy, NY

See also

 Strega Nona 26 Fairmount Avenue Maurice Sendak

References

 Further reading 

 "DePaola Papers in Kerlan Collection." School Library Journal March 1989: 88. Print.
 Elleman, Barbara. "A research project on the art of Tomie dePaola." Book Links Nov. 99: 21+. Print.
 ___. "Depaola, Tomie." Continuum Encyclopedia of Children's Literature. N.p.: Continuum International Publishing Group Ltd, 2003. Print.
 Insana, Lina. "Strega Nona's Ethnic Alchemy: Magic Pasta, Stregheria and That Amazing Disappearing 'N'." MELUS 31.2 (Summer 2006): 207-243. Print.
 Lodge, Sally. "Tomie dePaola Mines his Childhood Memories." Publishers Weekly 15 March 1999: 26. Print.
 Polk, Nancy. "Memories Make for his Many Ideas." New York Times 14 Nov. 1999: 19. Print.
 "Tomie De Paola." Current Biography Feb. 1999: 18+. Print.
 Tyson, Ann Scott. "DePaola's Wonderful World." Christian Science Monitor 26 Aug. 1997: 16. Print.

External links

 
 Tomie dePaola Collection at the University of Connecticut's Archives & Special Collections
 "David Wiesner and Tomie dePaola" by Stacy Patterson —with bibliography; evidently the sample course paper for INLS 890-087, A Child's Introduction to Reading, UNC School of Information and Library Science, Spring 2008
 Tomie dePaola at Library of Congress Authorities —with 288 catalog records
Interview with Tomie dePaola about Children's Theatre production of Mother Goose, All About Kids! TV Series'' #43 (1990)
 

1934 births
2020 deaths
American children's writers
American gay writers
American children's book illustrators
Laura Ingalls Wilder Medal winners
Newbery Honor winners
California College of the Arts alumni
Pratt Institute alumni
University of San Francisco alumni
New England College faculty
People from Meriden, Connecticut
Writers from Connecticut
Writers from New Hampshire
American writers of Italian descent
American people of Irish descent
20th-century American writers
21st-century American writers
LGBT people from New Hampshire
Colby–Sawyer College faculty
People from New London, New Hampshire
Accidental deaths in New Hampshire
20th-century American male writers
21st-century American male writers
Accidental deaths from falls
American gay artists
Newton College of the Sacred Heart faculty
Caldecott Honor winners